The bowling events at the 2009 World Games in Kaohsiung was played between 20 and 22 July. 46 competitors, from 23 nations, participated in the tournament. The bowling competition took place at Happy Bowling Alley.

Participating nations

Medal table

Events

References

External links
 Bowling on IWGA website
 Results

 
2009 World Games
2009